Anson Adams Mount IV (born February 25, 1973) is an American actor. He is known for his television roles as Cullen Bohannon in the AMC western drama series Hell on Wheels, as Jim Steele on the NBC series Conviction (2006), as the Marvel Comics superhero Black Bolt in the Marvel Cinematic Universe (MCU) media franchise (appearing in Inhumans and Doctor Strange in the Multiverse of Madness), and as Captain Christopher "Chris" Pike in the Star Trek television series Discovery, Short Treks (2019), and Strange New Worlds (2022present). He also starred opposite Britney Spears in the coming-of-age film Crossroads (2002). He is a member of the board of directors of METI (Messaging Extraterrestrial Intelligence).

Early life 
Mount's father, Anson Adams Mount II, was one of the original contributing editors to Playboy magazine. His mother, Nancy Smith, is a former professional golfer. From his father's first marriage, Mount has an older brother (Anson Adams III) and two sisters. 

Mount attended Dickson County High School in Dickson, Tennessee, Sewanee: The University of the South, and Columbia University.

Career

Stage

In 1998, Mount starred in Terrence McNally's Corpus Christi, for which he was honored by the Drama League.

In 2008, he was a finalist for the American Playwrights Conference at the O'Neill Center in 2008 for his full-length play Atomic City, and won the Maxim Mazumdar New Play Prize for his one-act play Love Liza? In 2010 he appeared in Anton Chekhov's Three Sisters at Classic Stage Company. In 2018 he appeared in Robert O'Hara's Mankind at Playwrights Horizons.

Film
Mount made his feature film debut in 2000 as Tully Coats in the independent film Tully.

In 2009, he produced and starred in the independent film Cook County, which earned awards at several major film festivals, including Hollywood, AFI Dallas, Nashville and SXSW.

In 2022, Mount portrayed Blackagar Boltagon / Black Bolt in the Marvel Cinematic Universe (MCU) film Doctor Strange in the Multiverse of Madness, reprising his role from 2017's Inhumans.

Television
Mount is widely known for his role as Cullen Bohannan on AMC's hit series Hell on Wheels, which he also produced from 2014–2016.

In 2017, he starred as Blackagar Boltagon / Black Bolt in the Marvel Cinematic Universe (MCU) ABC television series Inhumans.

In 2018, he was cast as Captain Christopher Pike of the Starship Enterprise in the CBS series Star Trek: Discovery. His performance was well received, and inspired a popular petition for a Pike spin-off series. In 2019, he reprised his role as Pike in a few Star Trek: Short Treks episodes. In May 2020 it was announced that, due in part to fans' requests, he would star as Pike in the new series Star Trek: Strange New Worlds, which premiered on May 5, 2022.

Academic

Mount is an adjunct assistant professor at Columbia University, teaching audition technique for graduate actors.

His non-fiction pieces have been published in the magazines Mosaic, The Daily Beast and Cowboys & Indians, and in the Calgary Herald newspaper.

Personal life
On July 8, 2017, Mount announced his engagement to his longtime girlfriend, photographer Darah Trang. They were married on February 20, 2018 and welcomed their first child, a daughter, in December 2021. He is an Episcopalian.

Credits

Film

Television

Theater

As producer/director/writer

Podcast 
Mount writes, produces, and hosts The Well podcast with his longtime friend Branan Edgens. He has served as a narrator on the Pseudopod podcast, reading the Thomas Ligotti story "The Town Manager."

Video games

References

External links 

 
 
 
The Well Podcast

1973 births
Living people
American male film actors
American male television actors
American podcasters
Columbia University alumni
People from Dickson County, Tennessee
Sewanee: The University of the South alumni
Male actors from Tennessee
Male actors from Los Angeles
20th-century American male actors
21st-century American male actors
Columbia University faculty
Hell on Wheels (TV series)
20th-century American Episcopalians
21st-century American Episcopalians